The President of Emporia State University is the chief administrator of the university. Each is appointed by and is responsible to the other members of that body, who delegate to him or her the day-to-day running of the university. The president of Emporia State is selected by the Kansas Board of Regents, the governing board for public universities in the state of Kansas, after a nationwide search.

Emporia State University is a public university in Emporia, Kansas, United States, east of the Flint Hills. Established in March 1863 and originally known as the Kansas State Normal School, Emporia State is the third oldest public university in the state of Kansas. Emporia State is one of six public universities governed by the Kansas Board of Regents. The university offers degrees in more than 80 courses of study through 4 colleges: the School of Business, College of Liberal Arts and Sciences, School of Library and Information Management, and The Teachers College. The Teachers College is one of only four post–secondary institutions in the nation to be identified as an Exemplary Model Teacher Education program by Arthur Levine in his 2006 national study of teacher education programs.

To date, the youngest president of Emporia State University has been Lyman Beecher Kellogg, who was the first president of what was the Kansas State Normal. When appointed as the first president of the new state normal school in January 1865, he was only 23 years old. The longest-serving president of the university was Thomas W. Butcher, who held the office for thirty years from 1913 to 1943. The first university alumnus to become its president was Joseph H. Hill in 1906.

He was named the 18th president in June 2022. Garrett replaced the sixteenth president, Michael Shonrock, and interim president, Jackie Vietti, and assumed her position on January 4, 2016. Garrett, who was previously the executive vice president at Abilene Christian University, was selected as Emporia State University's 17th president on October 22, 2015. Using the university's counting method (interim presidents are not numbered), Garrett was the seventeenth president of the university. Sixteen men and two women have served as the university's permanent president, and four men and one woman have served as its interim president pending the appointment of a permanent successor.

Each president is a qualified academic professor in some department of the university and will, on occasion, teach courses.

List of presidents
These persons have served as presidents or interim presidents of Kansas State Normal School (1863–1923), Kansas State Teachers College (1923–1974), Emporia Kansas State College (1974–1977), and Emporia State University (1977–present).

Timeline

See also
 List of Emporia State University people

References

External links
  – Office of the President
 Past Presidents website
 Past Interim Presidents website

 
Lists of people by university or college in Kansas
Lists of university and college leaders